Mary Craig Sinclair (1882–1961) was a writer and the wife of Upton Sinclair.

Early life and education
She was born Mary Craig Kimbrough in Greenwood, Mississippi on February 12, 1882, the oldest child of Mary Hunter (Southworth) and Allan McCaskill Kimbrough, a judge. Beginning at age 13, Mary studied at the Mississippi State College for Women (starting with what were essentially high school classes) and graduated from the Gardner School for Young Ladies in New York City in 1900. Her father was a wealthy attorney with banking interests, and a member of one of the oldest elite Mississippi families.

Career
Kimbrough (called Craig in many accounts) began writing and contributed regularly to newspapers and magazines. On a trip with her mother to a sanitarium in Battle Creek, Michigan, they attended a lecture by Upton Sinclair, who had published The Jungle, where they met him. Kimbrough talked with him about her writing and he began to teach her through their deepening relationship.

At the time of the Kimbrough-Sinclair marriage on April 21, 1913, the New York Times reported that Mary Craig Kimbrough was best known in the South for The Romance History of Winnie Davis, her biography of Winnie Davis, the daughter of Jefferson Davis. But in her autobiography, Craig said she never wanted to publish it because she found that "emotionalism and sentimentality among Confederate veterans made writing an objective study impossible." As she recalled, her future husband said, "Your book is terrible! You can't write. I can't honestly encourage you."

According to Craig, at her insistence Upton Sinclair published Sylvia (1913) under his name. Craig said that she wrote the novel about a Southern girl based on her own experiences. In her 1957 memoir, she described how she and her husband had collaborated on the work: 

Upton and I struggled through several chapters of Sylvia together, disagreeing about something on every page. But now and then each of us admitted that the other had improved something. I was learning fast now that this novelist was not much of a psychologist. He thought of characters in a book merely as vehicles for carrying his ideas.

Once married, she said they collaborated on a sequel, Sylvia's Marriage (1914), which was also published under Upton Sinclair's name, by John C. Winston Company, Philadelphia.

The writers disagreed about authorship.  In his 1962 autobiography, Upton Sinclair wrote: "[Mary] Craig had written some tales of her Southern girlhood; and I had stolen them from her for a novel to be called Sylvia."

Marriage and family
Kimbrough married Upton Sinclair on April 12, 1913. At the time her friends said she did not share her new husband's "liberal ideas on matrimony." He had once said that marriage is "nothing but legalized slavery...for the average married woman."

Her husband, Upton Sinclair, credited her with helping him to "write and publish three million books and pamphlets, flowing into every country in the world." In his autobiography, he portrayed Mary Sinclair as someone "who may not always have believed in what her husband was doing but cheerfully helped him do it."

Mental telepathy
Upton Sinclair's Mental Radio (1930) reported that Mary had telepathic powers. He included her testimony describing her technique and her assertion that others could acquire the same ability. Mary attempted to duplicate 290 pictures which were drawn by her brother. Sinclair claimed Mary successfully duplicated 65 of them, with 155 "partial successes" and 70 failures. The book was criticized by science writer Martin Gardner who wrote "As Mental Radio stands, it is a highly unsatisfactory account of conditions surrounding the clairvoyance tests. Throughout his entire life, Sinclair has been a gullible victim of mediums and psychics." The experiment was not done in scientifically controlled conditions and the possibility of sensory leakage had not been ruled out.

Works
 Sinclair included one of Mary Craig Sinclair's sonnets, "Sisterhood," in his 1915 anthology The Cry for Justice: An Anthology of the Literature of Social Protest.
 Craig Sinclair privately published a collection of her sonnets in the 1920s.
 Southern Belle: A Personal Story of a Crusader's Wife (1957). Her autobiography covers her life from her birth into privileged Mississippi society to her married life.

According to one reviewer, Sinclair reports on her early life with "sentimentality...that does no real harm. Indeed, it is rather touching." "Mrs. Sinclair," it said, "has produced a book interesting enough to suggest that she and Upton Sinclair learned from each other and significant enough to be worth attention." Another said her book told "a truly romantic as well as wonderfully goofy story" that would prove "irresistible to students of U.S. life and manners."

Sinclair had become extremely frail by the mid-1950s, and died in Monrovia, California, on April 26, 1961, at the age of 78.

Honors
 The poet George Sterling addressed his Sonnets to Craig (1928) to her.

References

1882 births
1961 deaths
Parapsychologists
Telepaths
Writers from Mississippi